Goruh (also Romanized as Gorūh; also known as Gorū and Gordeh) is a village in Radkan Rural District, in the Central District of Chenaran County, Razavi Khorasan Province, Iran. At the 2006 census, its population was 836, in 179 families.

References 

Populated places in Chenaran County